Luguvalium was a Roman town in northern Britain in antiquity. It was located within present-day Carlisle, Cumbria, and may have been the capital of the 4th-century province of Valentia.

Name
The Romans called the settlement at what is today Carlisle . This was originally thought to mean "wall[ed town] of Lugus" but has since been explained as a borrowed Brittonic placename reconstructed as *Luguwalion, meaning "[city] of Luguwalos", Luguwalos being a masculine Celtic given name meaning "strength of Lugus". The name apparently continued in use among Brythonic speakers in the Hen Ogledd and Wales and it was during that time that the initial element caer ("fort") was added.  The place is mentioned in Welsh sources such as Nennius, who calls it , and the Book of Taliesin where it is rendered  (Modern Welsh ). (These derived from the original Brittonic name, rather than from its Latin form.) The earliest record of the place in English is as Luel; later medieval forms include Cardeol, Karlioli, and Cærleoil.  These appear to suggest that the northern form of the name did not have the final -ydd. (Compare the River Derwent in Cumbria with Derwenydd in Wales, both from Brittonic *Derwentjū.)

History

Prehistoric
There are limited remains of a settlement during the British Iron Age. Before the Romans, the chief city of the Carvetii seems to have been Clifton Dykes.

Roman
Following their earlier conquest of Britain and Boudica's revolt, the Romans erected a timber fort south of the River Eden, on the site of the later Carlisle Castle, around AD 72. The settlement was listed as part of the northern leg of the Roman-era Antonine Itinerary. Following the fort's demolition around 103, a second timber fort was constructed. About 165, this was replaced by a stone fortress. Timber structures further to the south-east were probably associated military buildings. These were also later replaced in stone. When the civilian settlement in this area was enclosed by a stone wall is unknown, but it is generally assumed to have followed the line of the later medieval wall. The town probably became the civitas capital of the Carvetii tribe some time in the 2nd century and Cair Ligualid was listed among the 28 cities of Britain in Nennius. A single large stone building has been located which may have been for administrative use. Industry included copper working and tanning, while merchants are also in evidence. Inscriptions show there was a Mithraeum in the town and possibly a temple to Mars, who was identified with the local deity Belatucadros.

In 2017 the fort baths of the Hadrian's Wall fort of Stanwix, north of the River Eden, were discovered by the river in the cricket ground. Archaeological artefacts discovered in 2021 suggests the Roman emperor Septimius Severus and his consort Julia Domna may have spent time in Luguvalium around AD 208-211 since engraved stone fragment dedicated to the empress as well as the emperor's personal workshop-stamped tiles (Severus was campaigning in Scotland at the time)

Medieval

Romano-British occupation of Luguvalium seems to have continued unbroken after the Roman withdrawal from Britain around 410. Possible 5th-century buildings have been identified during excavation, and the settlement has been identified as the court of Urien Rheged's kingdom. Saint Cuthbert visited the town in the 7th century and, according to Bede, described the high stone walls and an impressive fountain, presumably fed by a still-functioning aqueduct.

References

External links
 Iromans a Tullie House Museum website

History of Carlisle, Cumbria
Roman towns and cities in England
Archaeological sites in Cumbria
Roman sites in Cumbria
Roman fortifications in England
Roman auxiliary forts in England